Narben der Zeit is the second album from the band Erben der Schöpfung.

Track listing

 Frequency 	 (5:16)
 Jane Churm 	 (4:54)
 Homeless 	 (3:57)
 Der tote See 	 (5:25)
 Leaving 	 (6:15)
 Freeze my soul  (6:15)
 Locked 	 (5:53)
 Krähenauge 	 (6:40)
 Your lullabies (6:44)
 Twisted        (4:40)

Limited edition

CD 1

 Frequency    	(5:16)
 Jane Churm 	(4:54)
 Homeless 	(3:57)
 Der Tote See 	(5:25)
 Leaving 	(6:15)
 Freeze My Soul (6:15)
 Locked  	 (5:53)
 Maybe Tomorrow  (bonus track)
 Krähenauge     (6:40)
 Your Lullabies (6:44)
 Twisted        (4:40)

CD + DVD video 2
 Going on after twilight
 Making of Narben der Zeit
 Making of Jane Churm 
 Jane Churm (Videoclip) (04:49)

Release
It was released on 20 November 2009 on the label M.O.S. Records ltd. This album is available in a Rare Special Deluxe Edition Box, including a DVD over 50 minutes, lighter, patch and three Stickers. The DVD includes: Interviews, Bandhistory, Studioreport of Narben der Zeit, Videoclip of Jane Churm, and Making of Video Jane Churm, this special will also be released with the regular jewel case edition on 27 November 2009.

References

External links
Erben der Schöpfung

2009 albums
Erben der Schöpfung albums
Napalm Records albums